Leonardo Dalla (born 1974) is a Brazilian Jiu-Jitsu black belt competitor and instructor. He was medalist in several major Brazilian Jiu-Jitsu competitions, such as the World Championship, Pan American Championship gi and no-gi, and Brazilian National Championship.

Leo Dalla was born in 1974, growing up in Rio de Janeiro – Brazil. Dalla started training in 1987 at age of 13, in Rio de Janeiro, Brazil becoming the very first student to receive a Black Belt under Master Jorge Pereira in June 1993.

Instructor lineage
Mitsuyo "Count Koma" Maeda → Carlos Gracie → Helio Gracie → Rickson Gracie → Jorge Pereira → Leonardo Dalla

References

1974 births
Living people
Brazilian submission wrestlers
Brazilian practitioners of Brazilian jiu-jitsu
Brazilian jiu-jitsu trainers
People awarded a black belt in Brazilian jiu-jitsu
Sportspeople from Rio de Janeiro (city)
Date of birth missing (living people)